Monica Niculescu was the defending champion, having won the event in 2012, but withdrew before the event started.

Aliaksandra Sasnovich won the tournament, defeating Magda Linette in the final, 4–6, 6–4, 6–2.

Seeds

Main draw

Finals

Top half

Bottom half

References 
 Main draw

2013 ITF Women's Circuit